Fresagrandinaria (locally Frò-išë) is a comune and town in the province of Chieti in the Abruzzo region of southern Italy.

Twin towns
 Nowa Sól, Poland
 Püttlingen, Germany
 Saint-Michel-sur-Orge, France
 Senftenberg, Germany
 Veszprém, Hungary
 Žamberk, Czech Republic

References

Cities and towns in Abruzzo